Fly Me to the Moon is an album by Michael Feinstein, featuring guitarist Joe Negri, released in 2010 through DuckHole Records, consisting of covers and jazz standards. The album reached a peak position of number 39 on Billboard Jazz Albums chart.

Track listing

Personnel
Musicians 
Michael Feinstein - Vocals
Joe Negri - Guitar
Jay Leonhart - Bass
Joe Cocuzzo - Drums

Technical
Paul Andre - Producer
Jim Czak - Engineer
David Glasser - Mastering
Bill Moss - Engineer

References 

2010 albums
Michael Feinstein albums